Crying Silicon Tears (Orig. To klama vgike ap' ton paradiso) is a 2001 Greek language film, directed by Thanasis Papathanasiou and Michalis Reppas.

Plot 
The movie is divided into three clear timelines, the 1960s, the World War II period and the bucolic period (in order from newest to oldest). In the 1960s, the rich Della Franca family start a fight with the poor Bisbikis family over a man that romances with women from both families. The Della Franca's manage to put the mother of the Bisbikis', Lavrentia, out of business, which triggers the World War II flashback, where Lavrentia worked with the Greek Resistance. In that period, another event triggers the bucolic period in the form of Lavrentia talking about her ancestors, a man and a woman that lived in a small village in the countryside. No clear main plot existent in any period, the film mainly revolves around Lavrentia's history and the tragic events that stained her life. In the end of the film, it is revealed that the Bisbikis' are actually blood-related to the Della Franca's and they all live happily ever after.

Although the film features mostly tragic events, they are presented in a way that parodies older movies of the Greek cinema, rendering them hilarious. It is both a tribute and a satire of old Greek dramas, war movies and bucolic-style films.

Cast 
Anna Panayiotopoulou as Lavrentia Bisbiki
Mirka Papakonstantinou as Tzella Della Franca
Mina Adamaki as Billio
Mimis Chrisomalis as Parnassos
Joys Evidi as Jenny Della Franca
Sofia Filippidou as Sirmo
Tasos Halkias as Mr. Baras
Antonis Kafetzopoulos as contact
Trifon Karatzas as Mr. Della Franca
Krateros Katsoulis as doctor
Maria Kavoyianni as Martha
Vladimiros Kiriakidis as German soldier 1
Kostas Koklas as German soldier 2
Ketty Konstadinou as Jenny's friend
Anna Kyriakou as Mrs. Baras
Renia Louizidou as party guest 1
Nena Menti as party guest 2
Yorgos Partsalakis as general of the Greek army
Michalis Reppas as Yiakoumis
Hristos Simardanis as Denis
Thodoros Siriotis as judge
Mary Stavrakeli as Zabeta
Christos Valavanidis as Heinrich Von Snitchell
Yannis Zouganelis as Kavouras

Quotes
 Ήξερες πάρα πολύ καλά ότι το πλοίο αυτό δεν έπρεπε να ταξιδέψει! Το Τζέλλα Δελτα είχε πρόβλημα: Δεν είχε φουγάρα! (You knew very well that this ship shouldn't have sailed! The Jella Delta had a problem: She didn't have smokestacks!)
 "I taught her well; until marriage, your man won't grab anything... Alright, some tit, but only on Saturday after the movies."

External links
 

2001 films
Greek musical comedy films
2000s Greek-language films
2000s musical comedy films
2001 comedy films